I Am Happy is a 2009 South Korean drama film directed by Yoon Jong-chan, starring Hyun Bin and Lee Bo-young. It is a film adaptation of Yi Chong-jun's short novel Mr. Cho, Man-deuk, which tells a story about wounded souls and an encounter between a patient and a nurse who met in a mental institution. The film was released in theaters on November 26, 2009.

The film was selected to be screen at the 13th Busan International Film Festival in 2008. However, it was not released in theaters until late 2009.

Plot
The deeply troubled Man-soo (Hyun Bin) becomes a patient at a psychiatric ward. He has a mother who suffers from dementia and a brother who is addicted to gambling. These sad and angry memories about his family always tie Man-soo down and are the reasons why he suffers from mental illness. Now institutionalized, Man-soo falls in love with Soo-kyung (Lee Bo-young), a nurse, who is also dealing with her own personal issues.

Cast

Main
 Hyun Bin as Man-soo
 Lee Bo-young as Soo-kyung

Supporting
 Kim Sung-min as Hyung-cheol
 Son Young-soon as Man-soo's mom
 Jung Jae-jin as Soo-kyung's dad
 Choi Jong-ryul as village headman
 Lee Yoon-gun as Man-cheol
 Park Hyo-joo as Nurse Young-sook
 Park No-shik as Bong-cheol
 Kim Dae-ho as Song-sik
 Park Young-seo as Seung-bok
 Kang Hye-ryun as nurse
 Jung Min-sung as scoundrel
 Eun Joo-hee as Sang-mi
 Uhm Tae-goo as bar employee

Production
The film was supported by the Jeonnam Film Commission and started shooting on March 27, 2008.

References

External links

 

2009 films
2009 drama films
South Korean drama films
Films about mental health
2000s South Korean films